Lanzhou railway station is a railway station located in Chengguan District, Lanzhou, Gansu Province along Huochezhan East Road. The station was established in October 1952, and is operated by China Railway Lanzhou Group. It handles both passenger and freight as a Class 1 station. It is served by Longhai railway, Lanzhou–Xinjiang railway and Baotou–Lanzhou railway.

Station facilities 

The station building has an area of 18,006 square meters, with a total area of 33,528 square metres with the outdoor square. It has been designed to hold 6,000 waiting passengers. It is served by an elevated footbridge across the lines, arrival and departure car ramps, escalators and central air conditioning, electronic ticketing and an electronic-oriented information inquiry system. The outdoor station square hosts a large replica of the ancient Flying Horse of Gansu, a symbol of Lanzhou.

Lanzhou station has five platforms and a total of 12 shared tracks (passenger and freight).

Usage 
The station is mostly used for regular speed rail services, being served by the Longhai railway, Lanzhou–Xinjiang railway and Baotou–Lanzhou railway as a major station. The average daily handling capacity is for passenger trains is about 100 trains, including various types of originating and through passenger trains.

High speed train services east to Xi'an and west to Ürümqi bypass this station via a tunnel to Lanzhou West railway station,  to the west. However high speed services on the Chongqing–Lanzhou railway do stop at Lanzhou station.

Metro station
A station for Line 2 of the Lanzhou metro is under construction at the northwest corner of the station square.

History 
 1 October 1952 : Lanzhou railway station was inaugurated.
 6 June 2002: The expansion project was completed

References 
 Daily: Lanzhou station celebrate the 50 anniversary
 Lanzhou Railway Bureau: Lanzhou Station Profile
 Lanzhou Railway Station Revitalization welcome the Spring Festival travel season

Stations on the Longhai Railway
Railway stations in Gansu
Railway stations in China opened in 1952
Transport in Lanzhou
Stations on the Lanzhou-Xinjiang Railway